Billbergia amoena is a plant species in the genus Billbergia. This species is endemic to Brazil but widely cultivated elsewhere as an ornamental.

References

amoena
Endemic flora of Brazil
Flora of the Atlantic Forest
Garden plants of South America
Plants described in 1817